Iran Dairy Industries Co.  (Persian: صنایع شیر ایران, Sâlad'-e Shir-e ´Iran) is a dairy corporation in Iran.

Company overview
Iran Dairy Industries Co. is the biggest dairy company in Middle East, producing 1.5 million tonnes of milk per year.
 
At present, 30% of domestic Iranian market is supplied by Iran Dairy Industries.

Company products 
 milk
 Yoghourt
 cream
 cheese
 Butter
 Kefir & doogh
 Ice Cream
 Dairy Powders
 Herbal Carbonated Drinks

Group of Companies
 Arak Pegah
East Azarbaijan Pegah
 West Azarbaijan Pegah
 Isfahan Pegah
 Tehran Pegah
 Pegah Golpayegan
 Zanjan Pegah
 Khorasan Pegah
 Khozestan Pegah
 Fars Pegah
 Kerman Pegah
 Lorestan Pegah
 Hamedan Pegah
 Lactana Packing Industry Pegah
 Market Wide Area 1
 Market Wide Area 2
 Market Wide Area 3
 Market Wide Area 5
 Commercial Sepide Kavir Fars
 Gilan Pegah
 Golestan Pegah

See also
 Pegah Golpaygan
 Iran Dairy New Products

References

External links
Iran Dairy official website

Dairy products companies of Iran
Manufacturing companies based in Tehran
Iranian brands